A list of films produced in Italy in 1929 (see 1929 in film):

See also
List of Italian films of 1928
List of Italian films of 1930

External links
 Italian films of 1929 at the Internet Movie Database

Italian
1929
Films